Christina "Chrissy" Hughes (born July 21, 1990) is an American former competitive figure skater. She is the 2007 JGP Harghita Cup and the 2007 JGP Sofia Cup gold medalist.

Personal life
Chrissy Hughes was raised in Issaquah, Washington and attended Liberty Senior High School. She was selected for the 2008 U.S. Figure Skating Scholastics Honors Team. She later studied at Seattle Pacific University in Seattle, Washington.

Career
Hughes competed in pair skating in 2003 with John "Mac" Kern.

As a single skater, she made her junior international debut at the 2007 Challenge Cup in The Hague, Netherlands and won the bronze medal. The following season, she was assigned to compete in the 2007–08 ISU Junior Grand Prix series. Hughes won two gold medals and qualified for the JGP Final where she finished eighth. She made her senior international debut at the 2008 Nebelhorn Trophy, where she finished 13th. She trained at the Highland Ice Arena in Shoreline, Washington.

In August 2012, Hughes won the U.S. Collegiate title.

Programs

Competitive highlights

References

External links

 

1990 births
Living people
Seattle Pacific University alumni
American female single skaters
Sportspeople from King County, Washington
People from Issaquah, Washington
21st-century American women